Christophe Riandee  (born February 5, 1968) is a French film producer and entrepreneur, best known for the productions of crime drama series Narcos and Hannibal.

Riandee is the Vice CEO of French film company Gaumont. He lives in Paris and Los Angeles.

Career 
Christophe Riandee graduated from the business school ESCP Europe in Paris. His early career steps include service network Ernst & Young, TV production company France Animation, where he was CEO and France Telecom (Orange S.A.) where he developed the Wanadoo theme channels.

In 2003 Riandee joined French film studio Gaumont where he was named Vice CEO in 2004. Under his leadership, Gaumont International Television was created in 2010 to produce mainly US series for international markets.  Subsequently the Los Angeles office was launched in 2011. Gaumont successfully entered the US American Market with the "straight-to-series" producing model. In 2016 Riandee received a  Golden Globe Award nomination for Narcos as "Best Television Series - Drama".

Classical music 
In 2002 Christophe Riandee founded the music school Jeune Choeur de Paris, a singing school for young singers. He is president of the classical music ensemble Ensemble Matheus in Paris.

Filmography 
 2010 - Last Night (executive producer)
 2010 - Twelve (executive producer)
 2013 - Paranoia (executive producer)
 2013 - Only God Forgives (executive producer)
 2013 - 2015 - Hemlock Grove (executive producer) 
 2013 - 2015 - Hannibal (executive producer)
 2014 - 2015 - Hotel de la Plage (producer)
 2015 - 2018 - Narcos (producer)
 2016 - The Neon Demon (executive producer) 
 2016 - 2017 - Glacé (executive producer) 
 2017 - 2021 - F is for Family (executive producer) 
 2017 - Belle and Sebastian (executive producer) 
 2017 - L'art du Crime (executive producer) 
 2018 - Narcos: Mexico (executive producer)
 2022 - present - Samurai Rabbit: The Usagi Chronicles (executive producer)
 2023 - High in the Clouds (producer)

References

External links 
 

1968 births
French film producers
French businesspeople
Living people